Acrolepiopsis californica is a moth of the family Acrolepiidae. It is found in western California, western Oregon and Alberta.

The length of the forewings 4.4–6.7 mm.

Larvae have been reared on Lilium pardalinum, Lilium washingtonianum, Disporum hookeri and possibly Disporum trachycarpum. They have been observed mining the fruit of their host plant. The larvae have also been found webbing and eating the inflorescence bud when young and expanding the web onto a subtending leaf. When older, they continue to feed by skeletonizing the underside of one of the two terminal leaves.

References

Moths described in 1984
Acrolepiidae